Maria Elvira "Marina" Berlusconi (born 10 August 1966 in Milan) is an Italian businesswoman, chairwoman of Fininvest Holding and of the Arnoldo Mondadori Editore publishing group. She is the oldest daughter of Italian businessman and politician Silvio Berlusconi.

Biography
Marina Berlusconi is the daughter of Silvio Berlusconi and his first wife Carla Elvira Lucia Dall'Oglio, and is the elder sister of the businessman Pier Silvio Berlusconi. She has two children.

After graduating from high school in classical studies, she began attending the Faculty of Law and then that of Political Science, both of which she abandoned in her first year. After an apprenticeship, Marina Berlusconi worked in several positions in the media business in Italy. She joined the board of Fininvest in 1994 alongside her brother Piersilvio. In 1995, she partook to the inauguration of the Spanish channel Telecinco. In July 1996 she was appointed Deputy Chairman of the media holding company founded by her father.

Since February 2003 she is the chairperson of Italy's largest magazine publisher, Mondadori.

She is also a member of the Board of Directors of MFE (until 2021 known as Mediaset SpA) and was on the Board of Directors of Mediobanca from October 2008 to April 2012.

In 2010 she was placed 48th in The World's 100 Most Powerful Women by Forbes, the only italian in the list (where she had been since 2004). Since 2001, she has also been included in Fortune's magazine's list of the 50 most influential women in the international business community. In 2013, 2016, and 2018 the US magazine The Hollywood Reporter included Marina Berlusconi in its of the most 20 most influential women in the media TV industry.

In 2011, Marina Berlusconi declared she never thought of entering politics. In 2014, she declared that it may happen eventually.

Personal life
In December 2008, Marina Berlusconi married Maurizio Vanadia, the former first dancer of La Scala in Milan. They had a son together before their marriage, Gabriele, born in 2002, and another named Silvio.

Prizes
2004-2010: she was named in The World's 100 Most Powerful Woman in the world by Forbes magazine
In 2009, the mayor of Milan, Letizia Moratti, awarded her the Gold Medal of the City of Milan (Ambrogino d'oro), as "an example of Milanese excellence in the world and the ability to reconcile professional and family life".

References

Italian mass media owners
21st-century Italian businesswomen
21st-century Italian businesspeople
Women corporate executives
1966 births
Living people
Marina
Children of national leaders
Fininvest
Businesspeople from Milan
20th-century Italian businesswomen
20th-century Italian businesspeople